Tephritomyia sericea is a species of tephritid or fruit flies in the genus Tephritomyia of the family Tephritidae.

Distribution
Sudan.

References

Tephritinae
Insects described in 1957
Diptera of Africa